This is a list of Christian monasteries and religious houses, both extant and dissolved, in Sweden, for both men and women.



A
 Åhus Priory, Åhus: Dominican friars
 Alsike Convent (extant) (founded 1978): Protestant sisters, Order of the Holy Paraclete (Helgeandssystrarna) 
 Alvastra Abbey (1143 - 1544): Cistercian monks
 Ås Abbey, Halland: Cistercian monks
 Askeby Abbey (c. 1100 x 1170 - 1529): Cistercian nuns

B
 Bäckaskog Abbey, Skåne: Premonstratensian canons

 Bosö Abbey, Skåne: Benedictine monks
 Byarum Abbey (c. 1170 - 1230; moved to Sko): Cistercian nuns
 Börringe Priory, Skåne

D
 Dalby Priory, Skåne: Augustinian monks (12th–16th century)
 Djusholm Abbey (extant): Bridgettines
 Dragsmark Abbey (Marieskog), Bohuslän: Premonstratensian canons

E
 Enköping: Franciscan friars

F
 Falun Abbey (extant): Bridgettines
 Fogdö, see Vårfruberga

G
 Grey Friar's Abbey, Stockholm (1270-1527): Franciscan monks
 Gudhem Abbey (1052/1152 - 1529): nuns of unknown order; later Cistercian nuns 
 Gudsberga Abbey (1486–1527): Cistercian monks

H
 Halmstad, Skåne: Franciscan friars
 Herrevad Abbey, Skåne: Cistercian monks

J
 Julita Abbey (aka Säby Abbey) (c. 1160 - 1527): Cistercian monks
 Jönköping Abbey

K
 Kalmar Nunnery (1299-1505), Dominikan nuns, moved to Skänninge Abbey
 Kastelle Abbey, Bohuslän: Augustinian Canons

Kungahålla, formerly Konghelle, Bohuslän: Franciscan friars
 Krokek (not later than 1440 - not later than 1538): Franciscan friars
 Kronobäck Hospital: hospital from 1292, at Kronobäck; under Knights Hospitallers from 1482 to 1529, when monastic parts demolished, and continued as secular hospital; date of closure nk

L
 Linköping: Franciscan friars

 Lund Abbey, Lund, Skåne: Benedictine monks

M
 Malmö, Skåne: Franciscan friars
 Mariefred Charterhouse or Gripsholm Charterhouse (1493–1526) near Gripsholm Castle; later in the town of Mariefred, named after the monastery: Carthusian monks
 Marstrand Friary, Marstrand, Bohuslän: Franciscan friars

N
 Nydala Abbey (1143 - 1529): Cistercian monks

O
 Örebro Priory: Carmelite friars
 Östanbäck Monastery (extant) (founded 1975) in Sala, Västmanland: Lutheran Benedictine monks (Heliga korsets brödraskap)
 Öved Abbey, Skåne: Premonstratensian canons

R

 Riseberga Abbey (12th century - 1500 x 1546): Cistercian nuns
 Roma Abbey (1164 - not later than 1531): Cistercian monks

S
 Säby, see Julita

 Skänninge Abbey (1272-1544): Dominican nuns
 Sko Abbey  (1230 - 1588): Cistercian nuns
 Solberga Abbey (1246 - 1404): Cistercian nuns
 St. Clare's Priory, Stockholm (1289 - Reformation): Poor Clares
 St Dominikus kloster, Rögle, Lund. (extant) (1956 - ): Dominikan sisters

T

 Trelleborg, Skåne: Franciscan friars

V
 Vadstena Abbey (extant) (1384–1595; the mother house of the Bridgettine Order; renewed Bridgettine presence from 1935; first abbess appointed 1991): Bridgettines
 Vårfruberga Abbey, previously known as Fogdö Abbey (12th century - 1527): Benedictine nuns until 1289, thereafter Cistercian nuns
 Varnhem Abbey (c. 1150 - 1527): Cistercian monks
 Vreta Abbey (c. 1099/1105 - 1582): Benedictine nuns until 1162, thereafter Cistercian nuns

Y
 Greyfriars Abbey, Ystad, Skåne: Franciscan friars

See also
 List of Christian monasteries in Denmark
 List of Christian monasteries in Norway
 List of Christian monasteries in Finland

Notes

Sources
 Askeby Abbey website: history page 

 
Sweden
Monasteries